Allan William McManus (born 17 November 1974 in Paisley, Renfrewshire) is a Scottish former professional football player and coach. He played for Hearts, Livingston, Alloa Athletic, Ayr United, Airdrie United, St Johnstone, Greenock Morton, Dumbarton, Arbroath and the now defunct Airdrie.

Career

Playing career
McManus scored his first St Johnstone goal on 2 January 2007, a 90th-minute winner against Ross County at McDiarmid Park.

McManus made his début for Morton in a 6–3 victory over Stranraer in the League Cup. After the sacking of Davie Irons, McManus was made caretaker manager of Greenock Morton alongside James Grady. They were appointed permanently, with McManus as the assistant manager. on 31 October 2009. McManus and Grady were sacked on 9 May 2010, after narrowly avoiding relegation from the First Division.

McManus was then offered a chance to take up playing again with Dumbarton, and agreed to sign for the 2010–11 season. McManus joined third division leaders Arbroath on a one–month emergency loan on 18 February 2011, but then retired from playing at the end of the season.

Coaching career
After an unsuccessful start to the 2016–17 season, St Mirren boss Alex Rae and his assistant David Farrell were both sacked by the club, with Head of Youth Development, McManus, being appointed interim manager.

Honours

Hearts
Scottish Cup: 1
 1997–98

Livingston
Scottish Football League First Division: 1
 2000–01

Airdrieonians
Scottish Challenge Cup: 1
 2001–02

Airdrie United
Scottish Football League Second Division: 1
 2003–2004

St Johnstone
Scottish Challenge Cup: 1
 2007–08

Managerial statistics

References

External links

1974 births
Living people
Footballers from Paisley, Renfrewshire
Scottish footballers
Association football central defenders
Heart of Midlothian F.C. players
Livingston F.C. players
Alloa Athletic F.C. players
Airdrieonians F.C. (1878) players
Ayr United F.C. players
Airdrieonians F.C. players
St Johnstone F.C. players
Greenock Morton F.C. players
Dumbarton F.C. players
Arbroath F.C. players
Greenock Morton F.C. non-playing staff
Scottish Football League players
St Mirren F.C. managers
St Mirren F.C. non-playing staff
Scottish football managers